Treaty of Turin can refer to one of the following treaties signed in the northern Italian town of Turin:

 Treaty of Turin (1381), between the Republic of Venice and the Republic of Genoa, ending the War of Chioggia
 Treaty of Turin (1632), between France and Savoy
 Treaty of Turin (1673), between Savoy and the Republic of Genoa
 Treaty of Turin (1696), between France and Savoy, during the War of the League of Augsburg
 Treaty of Turin (1701), between France and Savoy
 Treaty of Turin (1733), between France and the Kingdom of Sardinia
 Treaty of Turin (1754), between Geneva and the Kingdom of Sardinia, regulating their mutual frontier
 Treaty of Turin (1760), between France and the Kingdom of Sardinia, regulating their mutual frontier
 Treaty of Turin (1769), between France and the Kingdom of Sardinia, regulating their mutual frontier
 Treaty of Turin (1816), between the Kingdom of Sardinia and Switzerland, regulating their mutual frontier
 Treaty of Turin (1860), between France and the Kingdom of Sardinia, ceding Savoy and Nice to France, after the Second Italian War of Independence

See also
 Convention of Turin (1742), between Austria and Sardinia